Nerses Balients, also Nerses Balienc or Nerses Bagh'on, was a Christian Armenian monk of the early 14th century. He is mainly known for writing a history of the Kingdom of Cilician Armenia. Though his works are regarded by modern scholars as a valuable source from the time period, they are also regarded as frequently unreliable.

Life
Nerses Balients had been converted to Catholicism by the Dominicans. He was a member of the "United Brothers" (or "Unitarians") founded by the Dominican Barthelemy of Bologna, bishop of Maragha, which advocated a strict union of the Armenian Church with the Catholic Church. According to his writings, Nerses also used to call himself "Bishop of Urmia".

He visited Pope Clement V in Avignon and authored and translated various works while there.

Writings

Nerses Balients is the author of a history of the kings of Cilician Armenia, especially as regards their relations with the Mongols.

Combination with Sempad
Segments of the work of Nerses Balients have been inserted into Sempad's Chronique du Royaume de Petite Arménie, a version of which was compiled by the modern historian Edouard Dulaurier, who added information from Nerses Balients to expand on the period after Sempad's death.

Controversy

One challenged passage in this work is where Nerses wrote that the Armenian King Hetoum II, during his 1299 offensives in Syria with the Mongols, went with a small force as far as the outskirts of Cairo, and then spent some fifteen days in Jerusalem visiting the Holy Places:

Some historians considered Nerses Balient's statement as an indication that Mongols may have conquered, or at least been present in, Jerusalem in 1299. Claude Mutafian, in Le Royaume Arménien de Cilicie mentions the writings and the 14th century Armenian Dominican which claim that the Armenian king visited Jerusalem as it was temporarily removed from Muslim rule. Alain Demurger, in Jacques de Molay, mentions the possibility that the Mongols may have occupied Jerusalem, quoting an Armenian tradition describing that Hethoum celebrated mass in Jerusalem in January 1300. Some scholars, such as Dr. Sylvia Schein, have regarded this statement as an indication that Mongols may have been present in Jerusalem in 1299. In her 1991 book, Schein wrote that the Armenian information about Hetoum's visit was confirmed by Arab chroniclers.

However, other historians have strongly criticized Nerses Balienc's statement, and Schein's interpretation. Dr. Angus Donal Stewart in his 2001 book The Armenian Kingdom and the Mamluks, called the statement by Nerses Balienc an "absurd claim" from an unreliable source, and said that the Arab chroniclers did not confirm it in any way. Another historian, Reuven Amitai, also did a detailed comparison of all of the available primary sources about the events around the Battle of Wadi al-Khazindar, and concluded that the Armenian account was in error, as it did not match up with other similar sources about the same events, was provably full of exaggerations and inaccuracies, and had been written as to glorify the Armenian king Hetoum. Amitai also pointed out that despite  Schein's acceptance of the source as genuine, that even the original editor of the work, Edouard Dulaurier, had denied the veracity of the Armenian account.

In his work, Edouard Dulaurier actually writes that Nerses may have added a few fantastic details to exaggerate Hetoum's accomplishments somewhat, specifically disputing one instance in which Nerses claims that Hetoum went as far as Cairo, when Ghazan himself is known to have sent 15,000 men only as far as Gaza.

Notes

References

Primary sources
Chronique du Royaume de Petite Armenie, trans. and editions by Duraulier, in Receuil des Historiens des Croisades, Historiens Armeniens I, for some excerpts of the period after 1272 French translation: p.610 et seq.

Secondary sources
Receuil des Historiens des Croisades
Claude Mutafian, Le Royaume Armenien de Cilicie
Alain Demurger, Jacques de Molay

People from Kozan, Adana
Members of the Dominican Order
14th-century Armenian historians
Armenian Kingdom of Cilicia